James Lee Caroline (born 2 February 1999) is a British racing driver currently competing in the British GT Championship with Ram Racing.

Career

Karting

Ginetta Junior Championship
In 2014, Caroline made his car racing debut in the Ginetta Junior Championship with TCR, claiming two victories and finishing sixth overall. The following season, Caroline switched to HHC Motorsport, taking the title in dominant fashion.

Formula 4
In 2016, Caroline graduated to British F4, competing in four rounds with Jarum Racing before switching to Fortec Motorsports for the remainder of the season. There he claimed a victory and finished 10th overall. Caroline remained in the series for 2017, partnering with Carlin. He became the first driver to claim a race weekend grand slam in the British F4 series' history.

On 30 September 2017 Caroline won the British Formula 4 title at Brands Hatch.

USF2000 National Championship
After initially announcing a sabbatical year due to a lack of funds, he then moved to the U.S. F2000 National Championship for 2018, driving for BN Racing. He finished 25th in the standings after only competing at the opening 2 rounds of the championship.

Formula 3
In October 2016, Caroline contested the BRDC British F3 Autumn Trophy with Douglas Motorsport alongside ADAC F4 champion Joey Mawson. He achieved a podium and finished fifth in the overall standings. He returned to the series in 2018 at the Spa round, driving for Carlin. In 2019, he competed in the final round of the F3 Asian Winter Series for BlackArts Racing.

British GT
In 2019, Jamie Caroline entered the Brands Hatch round of the British GT Championship, driving for HHC Motorsport with Ruben Del Sarte.

For the 2020 season, Caroline was entered in TF Sport's GT4 squad, partnered with ex-Carrera Cup driver Dan Vaughan. They finished the season as champions of the GT4 category.

For the 2021 season, Caroline entered the last two rounds of British GT with Speedworks motorsport partnered with John Ferguson in the Toyota Gazoo Racing GR Supra GT4 qualifying second at Oulton park to Darren turner in his first outing in the car then scoring pole by half a second over Sennan fielding at Donington Park.

GT4 European Series
For the 2021 season, Caroline entered the 2021 GT4 European Series, alongside Jean-Luc D'Auria, competing for Trivellato Racing by Villorba Corse in which he did not complete the full season.

Racing record

Career summary

Complete F4 British Championship results 
(key) (Races in bold indicate pole position) (Races in italics indicate fastest lap)

Complete U.S. F2000 National Championship results

Complete British GT Championship results
(key) (Races in bold indicate pole position in class) (Races in italics indicate fastest lap in class)

† Driver did not finish, but was classified as he completed 90% race distance.

Complete GT4 European Series Results
(key) (Races in bold indicate pole position in class) (Races in italics indicate fastest lap in class)

† Driver did not finish, but was classified as he completed 90% race distance.

References

External links

1999 births
Living people
People from Tandridge (district)
English racing drivers
British F4 Championship drivers
BRDC British Formula 3 Championship drivers
U.S. F2000 National Championship drivers
British GT Championship drivers
Ginetta Junior Championship drivers
Carlin racing drivers
Karting World Championship drivers
Fortec Motorsport drivers
GT4 European Series drivers
HMD Motorsports drivers